Claflin University is a private historically black university in Orangeburg, South Carolina. Founded in 1869 after the American Civil War by northern missionaries for the education of freedmen and their children, it offers bachelor's and master's degrees.

History 

It was originally named Claflin College, and was founded in 1869 by Alonzo Webster (1818–1887), a minister for the Methodist Episcopal Church (today the United Methodist Church). Claflin College opened its doors on October 27, 1869.

Webster came from Vermont to South Carolina as a missionary to teach at the Baker Bible Institute in Charleston, a training school for African American ministers. The Baker Biblical Institute in Charleston, was an institution established by the South Carolina Mission Conference of 1866 of the Methodist Episcopal Church for the education of African American ministers. In 1870, the Baker Biblical Institute merged with Claflin University. 

Webster had received a charter from the state of South Carolina to establish a college freed slaves to take their rightful places as full American citizens. Claflin University is the oldest historically black college or university in South Carolina and touts itself as the first college in the state to welcome all students regardless of race or gender. It was the first Black college to offer architectural drawing courses.

The university was named after two Methodist churchmen: Massachusetts Governor William Claflin and his father, Boston philanthropist Lee Claflin, who provided a large part of the funds to purchase the  campus. Claflin's first president was Alonzo Webster, who had previously spent time as a member of Claflin's board of trustees. Since the administration of Webster, Claflin has been served by eight presidents.

An act by the South Carolina General Assembly on March 12, 1872, designated the South Carolina State Agricultural and Mechanical Institute as a part of Claflin University. In 1896 the S.C. General Assembly passed an act of separation which severed the State Agricultural and Mechanical Institute from Claflin University and established a separate institution which eventually became South Carolina State University.

In 2020, American novelist and philanthropist MacKenzie Scott donated US $20 million to Claflin University. Her donation is the largest single gift in Claflin's history.

Presidents

Academics

Claflin offers degrees through four schools:

School of Natural Sciences and Mathematics
School of Humanities and Social Sciences
School of Business
School of Education

Student life

Athletics 
Claflin athletic teams are the Panthers. The university is a member of the Division II level of the National Collegiate Athletic Association (NCAA), primarily competing in the Central Intercollegiate Athletic Association (CIAA) since the 2018–19 academic year. The Panthers previously competed in the Southern Intercollegiate Athletic Conference (SIAC) from 2008–09 to 2017–18; as well as in the defunct Eastern Intercollegiate Athletic Conference (EIAC) from 1983–84 to 2004–05.

Claflin competes in ten intercollegiate varsity sports: Men's sports include basketball, baseball, cross country and track & field; while women's sports include basketball, cheerleading, cross country, softball, track & field and volleyball.

Claflin has an All-Girl cheerleading team that serves as athletics support and ambassadors of the university as well as their pep-band.

Student organizations 
There are over 50 student organizations on campus.

Reserve Officers Training Corps 

Claflin graduates who complete the R.O.T.C. program (a cross-enrollment agreement with South Carolina State University) may be commissioned as second lieutenants in the U.S. Army.

National Pan-Hellenic Council 

The university currently has chapters for eight of the nine National Pan-Hellenic Council organizations.

Notable alumni

References

External links 

 
 Official athletics website

 
University and college buildings on the National Register of Historic Places in South Carolina
Private universities and colleges in South Carolina
Historically black universities and colleges in the United States
Educational institutions established in 1869
Methodism in South Carolina
Colonial Revival architecture in South Carolina
Universities and colleges accredited by the Southern Association of Colleges and Schools
African-American history of South Carolina
Education in Orangeburg County, South Carolina
Buildings and structures in Orangeburg County, South Carolina
National Register of Historic Places in Orangeburg County, South Carolina
1869 establishments in South Carolina